Last Chance is a populated place in Lucas County, Iowa, United States.

References

Geography of Lucas County, Iowa